Hypogymnia tubulosa is a species of foliose lichen in the family Parmeliaceae. Ludwig Emanuel Schaerer formally described it in 1840 as a variety of Parmelia ceratophylla. Johan Johnsen Havaas promoted it to distinct species status in 1918.

The lichenicolous fungus Tremella tubulosae, described as a new species in 2020, has been recorded in Scotland and Spain. It causes the formation of distinct, convex, dark brown to blackish galls on the surface of the host thallus.

Chemistry
Hypogymnia tubulosa contains several secondary chemicals, including four depsidones (3-hydroxyphysodic, 4-O-methyl physodic acid, physodic and physodalic acid), and two depsides (atranorin and chloroatranorin). Other metabolites that have been identified are atranol, chloroatranol, atraric acid, olivetol, olivetonide and 3-hydroxyolivetonide.

References

tubulosa
Lichen species
Lichens described in 1840
Lichens of Europe
Taxa named by Ludwig Schaerer